This is a list of Thailand women's One-day international cricketers. A One Day International (ODI), is an international cricket match between two representative teams, each having ODI status. An ODI differs from Test matches in that the number of overs per team is limited, and that each team has only one innings. Thailand women were granted ODI status by the International Cricket Council in May 2022. They played their first official ODI matches during a home series against the Netherlands in November 2022.

The list is arranged in the order in which each player won her first ODI cap. Where more than one player won her first ODI cap in the same match, those players are listed alphabetically by surname.

Key

Players 
Statistics are correct as of 26 November 2022.

See also
List of Thailand women Twenty20 International cricketers

References 

Thailand
Thailand sport-related lists